Tuberous begonias  (Begonia × tuberhybrida Voss, also known as the Tuberhybrida Group or the Tuberosa Group) are a group of Begonia cultivars, sometimes regarded as some of the most spectacular of the genus.

One of the first hybrids produced was B. x sedenii in 1870, a cross between B. boliviensis, collected by botanist Richard Pearce and a species from the Andes. Another species from Peru, B. davisii (named after Walter Davis), was also used in early breeding.

Nomenclature
The University of Vermont recognises the following 13 groups:

 (S) Single — large single flowers, four usually flat tepals (flower part undistinguishable as sepal or petal)
 (Fr) Frilled, Crispa — large single flowers, tepal margins frilled or ruffled
 (Cr) Cristata, Crested — large single flowers, frilled or tufted center of tepals
 (N) Narcissiflora, Daffodil-flowered — large more or less double flowers, central tepals form "trumpet"
 (C) Camellia, Camelliflora — large double flowers resembling camellias, unruffled, solid colors
 (RC) Ruffled Camellia — camellia flowers ruffled on edges
 (R) Rosebud, Rosiflora — large double flowers with rose bud-like center
 (Car) Carnation, Fimbriata Plena — large double carnation-like flowers, tepals fringed on margins
 (P) Picotee — large usually double flowers like camellias, tepals with different color on margin blending with other color
 (M) Marginata — like Picotee only distinct non-blending line of color on margins
 (Mar) Marmorata, Marbled — like Camellia but rose-colored, blotched or spotted with white
 (HB) Hanging Basket, Pendula — stems trailing or pendant, large to small flowers single or double
 (Mul) Multiflora — low, bushy, compact plants with many small single or double flowers

Other systems confusingly use binomial nomenclature to refer to flower types, by the terms Begonia grandiflora, Begonia multiflora and Begonia pendula. The last two correspond to groups 13 and 12, respectively. The first type, grandiflora (large flowered), is then subdivided by flower form; e.g. Begonia grandiflora erecta.

Cultivation

Tuberous begonias grow best in partial shade or filtered sunlight. Excessive exposure to sunlight can result in burnt flowers and leaves. However, too much shade will result in compensatory growth of foliage at the expense of flowers.

Soil

When preparing the soil for Begonia tuberhybrida, good drainage is important. Plant a Begonia in a pot with equal parts perlite and coarse sand. Remember that sand has an excellent soil structure as it consists of tiny spaces where air, water and nutrients can move freely.

References

tuberhybrida
Ornamental plant cultivars
Hybrid plants